Põlva FC Lootos is an Estonian football club based in Põlva. The club was founded in 1994. Lootospark is their home stadium.

History
The club was founded in 1994. Lootos played their first season in the second division of the Estonian championship. The club was mostly packed with former Põlva SK Serviti players.
The traditional colours of Lootos are black and yellow. Club colours are inspired by the kit of German football club BVB.
The women's team is more successful in Estonia and have played in the highest level of country Meistriliiga, while the men's team resides in the fifth Division

Stadium
Lootos' home stadium is a recently built 4G artificial ground Lootospark which holds a capacity of 600 and has an under-soil heating system.

Sponsors

Men's team

Current squad
 As of 1 October 2022

Player of the Year

 2008   Alar Alve
 2009   Alar Alve
 2010   Alar Alve
 2011   Egon Kasuk
 2012   Erik Listmann
 2013   Tauri Kolk
 2014   Raigo Orti
 2015   Priit Rahuelu
 2016   Priit Rahuelu
 2017   Jürgen Juks
 2018   Jürgen Juks
 2019   Jürgen Juks
 2020   Markus Villako
 2021   Tauri Kolk

League results since 1994

Women's team

Management

Current backroom staff

First Team

Team managers history

Non-playing staff

References

External links
Official website 
JK Lootos Facebook 

Football clubs in Estonia
Association football clubs established in 1994
1994 establishments in Estonia
Põlva Parish